The Chandyr River is a tributary of the Atrek River in Turkmenistan.

See also 
 Sumbar River

References 

Border rivers
Rivers of Iran
Rivers of Turkmenistan